Nilus the Younger, also called Neilos of Rossano (910 – 27 December 1005) was a monk and abbot from Calabria. He was the founder of Italo-Byzantine monasticism in southern Italy. He is venerated as a saint in the Eastern Orthodox and Roman Catholic churches, and his feast day is celebrated on September 26 in both the Byzantine Calendar and the Roman Martyrology.

Biography
Born to an Italian family of Byzantine rite ("Greek rite") of Rossano, in the Byzantine theme of Calabria, for a time he was married and had a daughter. Sickness brought about his conversion, however, and from that time he became a monk and a propagator of the rule of Saint Basil in Italy.

He was known for his ascetic life, his virtues, and theological learning. For a time he lived as a hermit, but his reputation drew followers to Rossano, whom he began to instruct. However, after a while, he realized that he was viewed as a local authority, and hearing that there was talk of making him bishop, Nilus fled to Capua, where he stayed for fifteen years. Later he spent certain periods of his life at various monasteries which he either founded or restored. Although Nilus instructed his monks according to the Rule of St. Basil, he maintained cordial relations with the Benedictines at Monte Cassino, where he spent some time, as well as at the Alexius monastery in Rome. The Rule of St. Basil was one of the resources Benedict had recourse to when drafting his own rule. 

When Pope Gregory V (996–999) was driven out of Rome, Nilus opposed the usurpation of Philogatos of Piacenza as antipope.  According to his disciple and biographer, Bartholomew, in 998 Nilus hastened to Rome to intercede on behalf of a fellow native of Rossano, John Philogathos, who had, against the advice of Nilus, cooperated in an ill-advised scheme of the Roman noble Crescentius to depose the Emperor Otto III's kinsman, Pope Gregory V. Later when Philogathos was tortured and mutilated, Nilus reproached Gregory and the Emperor for this crime, prophesying that "the curse of heaven sooner or later would affect their cruel hearts".

Nilus main works were the foundation in 1004 of the famous Greek monastery of Grottaferrata, near Frascati, on lands granted him by Gregory, count of Tusculum; he is counted the first abbot. At the time Calabria was under the Byzantine rule and was Koine Greek in language, culture, and spiritual and liturgical tradition. The abbey continues in the Byzantine rite. He spent the end of his life partly in the Sant'Agata monastery in Tusculum and partly in a hermitage at Valleluce near Gaeta. He died in the Sant'Agata monastery in 1005.

Saint Nilus is revered as the patron saint of scribes and calligraphers.

Notes

References

Sources

 Santa Maria di Grottaferrata

Further reading
 David Paul Hester. Monasticism and Spirituality of the Italo-Greeks. Volume 55 of Analekta Vlatadōn. Patriarachal Institute for Patristic Studies [Patriarchikon Hidryma Paterikon Meleton], 1992. pp. 200–221.

910 births
1005 deaths
People from Rossano
10th-century Byzantine monks
11th-century Christian saints
Byzantine saints
Basilian saints
Medieval Italian saints
Byzantine hymnographers